The Duke of Gloucester Islands is a subgroup of the Tuamotu group in French Polynesia. They are located southeast of Tahiti and south of the main Tuamotu atoll cluster and are rather isolated.

Atolls
The Duke of Gloucester Islands include four atolls of relatively small size:

 Anuanuraro
 Anuanurunga
 Hereheretue
 Nukutepipi

Hereheretue is the only permanently inhabited island of the Duke of Gloucester Islands, with 57 inhabitants in 2002.

History
First sighting recorded by Europeans was by the Spanish expedition of Pedro Fernández de Quirós on 4 February 1606. They were named Cuatro Coronas ("Four Crowns" in Spanish). Gaspar González de Leza, pilot of Fernández de Quiros, charted them as Cuatro Anegadas ("Flooded Four").

They were renamed Duke of Gloucester Islands by the British explorer Philip Carteret, who visited them in 1767, in honour of Prince William, Duke of Gloucester.

Administration
Administratively the four atolls of the Duke of Gloucester Islands belong to the commune of Hereheretue, which is associated with the Hao commune.

References

External links 

Maps of all the Duke of Gloucester atolls

Atolls of the Tuamotus
Archipelagoes of the Pacific Ocean